2007 floods may refer to:

 2006-2007 Malaysian floods
 2007 United Kingdom floods
 2007 South Asian floods
 2007 Sudan floods
 June 2007 Hunter Region and Central Coast storms
 2007 Midwest flooding in the United States
 2007 Mozambican flood
 2007 North Korea flooding
 2007 Jakarta flood
 March 2007 floods in the Argentine littoral
 June 2007 Texas flooding
 2007 Tabasco flood

See also

 List of notable floods
 Floods in the United States: 2001-present